Nawaz Public Higher Secondary School Palam Rajauri is an English and Urdu-medium Higher Secondary School located in the town of Palma in Rajauri district, Jammu and Kashmir, India.
It was established in 1982 founder patron of school is Haji Sikander Parvez Khan.

School activities 
The students organise an annual function, teachers day, farewell functions, and cultural festivals. Its facilities are a computer and faculty of Educomp Smart Classes, and library. Transportation is supplied, and sports and games practised. The school students is also participate in morning assembly.

Educational institutions established in 1972
High schools and secondary schools in Jammu and Kashmir
Schools in Jammu (city)
1972 establishments in Jammu and Kashmir